Forest Liesel is a 1956 West German comedy drama film directed by Herbert B. Fredersdorf and starring Anita Gutwell, Rudolf Lenz and Lotte Ledl. It is part of the post-war group of rural-set heimatfilm. The film was made in Agfacolor. The film's sets were designed by Wolf Witzemann. It was shot on location in the Austrian Tyrol. It is a follow up by Fredersdorf to the previous financial success of The Milkmaid of St. Kathrein (1955).

Cast
 Anita Gutwell as Försterliesel
 Rudolf Lenz as Tony, der junge Jäger
 Lotte Ledl as Zenzi, die Magd
 Rudolf Carl as Zwutschenthaler
 Eva Maria Meineke as Carola
 Erik Frey as Robert Burgert
 Hardo Hesse as Bartl
 Harry Kratz as Heinzl, Liesels Vetter
 Fritz Muliar as Schneider
 Ferry Wondra as Loisl
 Ernst Pröckl
 Walter Stummvoll as Der alte Förster Bregler
 Monika Glieber
 Anton Geiger

References

Bibliography 
 Fritsche, Maria. Homemade Men in Postwar Austrian Cinema: Nationhood, Genre and Masculinity. Berghahn Books, 2013.

External links 
 

1956 films
West German films
German comedy-drama films
1956 comedy-drama films
1950s German-language films
Films directed by Herbert B. Fredersdorf
Films set in the Alps
Films about hunters
1956 comedy films
1956 drama films
1950s German films